Joseph Mathias Kovacs (born June 28, 1989) is an American track and field athlete who competes in the shot put and has a personal record of 23.23 meters outdoors and 22.05 meters indoors. He won gold medals at the 2015 and 2019 World Championships.  He won silver medals at the 2017 World Championships, 2016 and 2020 Summer Olympics. His personal best of 23.23 metres makes him the second best competitor all-time in the shot put event. Since college he was coached by Art Venegas, widely regarded as one of the best coaches in the world and the only coach to have athletes reach 73' with both the glide and rotational techniques in the shot put. Since 2019 he has been coached by his wife, Ashley Kovacs.

Early life and education
Kovacs was born in Nazareth, Pennsylvania on June 28, 1989. He excelled in high school track and field, winning PIAA titles in discus and shot put during his senior season. He attended Pennsylvania State University.

Track and field career
In his first year as a professional, Kovacs was sponsored by Nike, Inc. He missed the podium with a 4th-place finish in the United States Olympic Trials with a best throw of 21.08m/69-2, placed 4th at the NCAA Division I outdoor championships with a best throw of 19.58 m (65–1.5 feet), but won the shot put at the Big Ten Conference outdoor championships with a best throw of 20.85 m (68–5 feet). He enjoyed a success filled summer on the European track circuit with 2nd in Paris (20.44 meters, 67–0.75 feet); 2nd in Madrid (19.56 meters, 64–2.25 feet) and 6th in London (19.61 meters, 64–4 feet).

Kovacs, in his second year as a professional, threw a season best of 20.82 meters (68–3.75 feet) at Tucson Elite Meet on May 18, 2013 which ranks him 6th in the US.

Kovacs won the New Balance Indoor Grand Prix with his first 70-foot throw. On June 25, 2014 Joe Kovacs won the 2014 USA Outdoor Track and Field Championships at a special venue in front of the California State Capitol, with a personal best of 22.03m (72' 3.5"), the top throw in the world for 2014.

It was the farthest throw in the world since 2010 and ranked him as the No. 12 performer of all time. After winning his second National Championship in June, Kovacs improved again, adding another 21 cm to throw  at the Herculis meet in Monaco. That throw moved him past four Americans to the number 8 performer in history and the best throw since 2003.

On July 1, 2016, Kovacs qualified for his first Olympic team by finishing in second place at the Olympic Trials. He then won a silver medal at the 2016 Olympics with a throw of 21.78 meters (71' 5.5"). He finished behind teammate Ryan Crouser, who threw an Olympic Record 22.52 meters (73' 10.5"). On Oct 5, 2019, Kovacs won the Gold Medal at the Outdoor World Championships with a 22.91 meter Shot Put on his final throw of the event. He was coached by his wife and they are featured in an Olympic Channel feature commercial together.

Personal life
Kovacs is married to former collegiate shot-putter and Vanderbilt throwing coach Ashley Kovacs (Muffet). In 2019, Ashley began coaching Joe professionally.

References

External links

https://web.archive.org/web/20150908000433/http://www.gopsusports.com/sports/c-track/mtt/kovacs_joe00.html
http://www.legacy.usatf.org/usatf/files/14/14708be3-a929-4cf0-9c93-b6bff6e49ae1.pdf

1989 births
Living people
Bethlehem Catholic High School alumni
Penn State Nittany Lions men's track and field athletes
American male shot putters
American people of Hungarian descent
American people of Italian descent
World Athletics Championships athletes for the United States
World Athletics Championships medalists
World Athletics Championships winners
Athletes (track and field) at the 2016 Summer Olympics
Medalists at the 2016 Summer Olympics
Olympic silver medalists for the United States in track and field
Athletes (track and field) at the 2020 Summer Olympics
Medalists at the 2020 Summer Olympics
People from Nazareth, Pennsylvania
Sportspeople from Bethlehem, Pennsylvania
Olympic male shot putters
Track and field athletes from Pennsylvania
Diamond League winners
USA Outdoor Track and Field Championships winners
20th-century American people
21st-century American people